A History of the World in 100 Objects was a joint project of BBC Radio 4 and the British Museum, consisting of a 100-part radio series written and presented by British Museum director Neil MacGregor. In 15-minute presentations broadcast on weekdays on Radio 4, MacGregor used objects of ancient art, industry, technology and arms, all of which are in the British Museum's collections, as an introduction to parts of human history. The series, four years in planning, began on 18 January 2010 and was broadcast over 20 weeks. A book to accompany the series, A History of the World in 100 Objects by Neil MacGregor, was published by Allen Lane on 28 October 2010. The entire series is also available for download along with an audio version of the book for purchase. The British Museum won the 2011 Art Fund Prize for its role in hosting the project.

In 2016, a touring exhibition of several items depicted on the radio programme, also titled A History of the World in 100 Objects, travelled to various destinations, including Abu Dhabi (Manarat Al Saadiyat), Taiwan (National Palace Museum in Taipei), Japan (Tokyo Metropolitan Art Museum in Tokyo, Kyushu National Museum in Daizafu, and Kobe City Museum in Kobe), Australia (Western Australian Museum in Perth and National Museum of Australia in Canberra), and China (National Museum of China in Beijing and Shanghai Museum in Shanghai).

The ownership claims of the British Museum over some of these objects is highly contested, in particularly those belonging to the Benin Bronzes and the Elgin Marbles, which are the subject of continued international controversy.

Content

The programme series, described as "a landmark project", is billed as 'A history of humanity' told through a hundred objects from all over the world in the British Museum's collection.

Accompanying the series is a website, described by The Guardian as "even more ambitious [than the radio series itself] that encourages users to submit items of their own for a place in world history", along with much interactive content, detailed information on all the objects featured in the radio programmes and links to 350 other museum collections across the UK. The radio programmes are available on the website permanently for listening or downloading.

The museum has adapted exhibitions for the series by including additional easily identifiable plaques for the 100 objects with text based on the programme and adding a section to the gallery maps showing the location and numbers of the 100 objects.

On 18 January 2010, an hour-long special of The Culture Show on BBC2 was dedicated to the launch of the project.

The first part of the series was broadcast on weekdays over six weeks between 18 January and 26 February 2010. After a short break, the series returned with the seventh week being broadcast in the week beginning 17 May 2010. It then took another break in the middle of July and returned on 13 September 2010, running until the 100th object was featured on Friday 22 October 2010.

It has been repeated a number of times, mostly recently over the summer of 2021.

Reception
Maev Kennedy of The Guardian described the programme as "a broadcasting phenomenon", while Tim Davie, head of music and audio at BBC radio, commented that "the results have been nothing short of stunning", exceeding the BBC's wildest hopes for the programme. At the time of the writing of Kennedy's article, just before the start of the last week of the series, the radio broadcasts regularly had up to four million listeners, while the podcast downloads had totalled 10,441,884. Of these, just over half, 5.7 million, were from the UK.  In addition, members of the public had uploaded 3,240 objects with the largest single contribution coming from Glasgow historian Robert Pool who submitted 120 objects all relating to the City of Glasgow, and other museums a further 1,610, and 531 museums and heritage sites across the UK had been mounting linked events – an unprecedented partnership, MacGregor said. Museums all over the world are now copying the formula, as thousands of visitors every day set out to explore the British Museum galleries equipped with the leaflet mapping the objects.

Writing in The Independent, Philip Hensher described the series as "perfect radio", saying "Has there ever been a more exciting, more unfailingly interesting radio series than the Radio 4/British Museum venture, A History of the World in 100 Objects? It is such a beautifully simple idea, to trace human civilisations through the objects that happen to have survived. Each programme, just 15 minutes long, focuses on just one thing, quite patiently, without dawdling. At the end, you feel that you have learnt something, and learnt it with pleasure and interest.  For years to come, the BBC will be able to point to this wonderful series as an example of the things that it does best. It fulfils, to a degree that one thought hardly possible any more, the BBC's Reithian agenda of improvement and the propagation of learning and culture."

Dominic Sandbrook in The Telegraph said that the "joyously highbrow" series "deserves to take its place alongside television classics such as Kenneth Clark's Civilisation and Jacob Bronowski's The Ascent of Man."

In 2019, 100 Histories of 100 Worlds in 1 Object was launched as a response to the original 100 Objects project. Addressing critiques by the same project of the Radio 4 series that pointed to the programme's perceived failure [...] ‘[ to engage with the provenance and repatriation of objects]’, especially those which were collected under colonial conditions of duress, the response project sought instead to democratize curatorial narratives with input from source and diaspora communities who hold long-standing relationships with objects now-held in museums. The project aims to focus on voices from the “Global South” that the original series left out. Co-initiated and facilitated by Dr Mirjam Brusius and Dr Alice Stevenson, the project works collaboratively and has an editorial board with members from India, Namibia, Thailand, Ghana, Nigeria, Torres Strait Islands, Aotearoa, Jamaica, USA, Mexico and the United Kingdom.

Objects

Making us human (2,000,000–9,000 BC)
"Neil MacGregor reveals the earliest objects that define us as humans." First broadcast week beginning 18 January 2010.

After the Ice Age: food and sex (9,000–3,000 BC)
"Why did farming start at the end of the Ice Age? Clues remain in objects left behind." First broadcast week beginning 25 January 2010.

The first cities and states (4,000–2,000 BC)
"What happens as people move from villages to cities? Five objects tell the story." First broadcast week beginning 1 February 2010.

The beginning of science and literature (1500–700 BC)
"4,000 years ago, societies began to express themselves through myth, maths and monuments." First broadcast week beginning 8 February 2010.

Old world, new powers (1100–300 BC)
"Across the world new regimes create objects to assert their supremacy." First broadcast week beginning 15 February 2010.

The world in the age of Confucius (500–300 BC)
"Can meanings hidden in friezes and flagons tell us as much as the writings of great men?" First broadcast week beginning 22 February 2010.

Empire builders (300 BC – AD 1)
"Neil MacGregor continues his global history told through objects. This week he is with the great rulers of the world around 2,000 years ago." First broadcast week beginning 17 May 2010.

Ancient pleasures, modern spice (AD 1–600)
"Neil MacGregor explores the ways in which people sought pleasure 2,000 years ago." First broadcast week beginning 24 May 2010.

The rise of world faiths (AD 200–600)
"Neil MacGregor explores how and when many great religious images came into existence." First broadcast week beginning 31 May 2010.

The Silk Road and beyond (AD 400–700)
"Five objects from the British Museum tell the story of the movement of goods and ideas." First broadcast week beginning 7 June 2010.

Inside the palace: secrets at court (AD 700–950)
"Neil MacGregor gets an insight into the lives of the ruling elites 1200 years ago." First broadcast week beginning 14 June 2010.

Pilgrims, raiders and traders (AD 900–1300)
"How trade, war and religion moved objects around the globe 1000 years ago." First broadcast week beginning 21 June 2010.

Status symbols (AD 1200–1400)
"Neil MacGregor examines objects which hold status and required skilful making." First broadcast week beginning 28 June 2010.

Meeting the gods (AD 1200–1400)
"Objects from the British Museum show how the faithful were brought closer to their gods." First broadcast week beginning 5 July 2010.

The threshold of the modern world (AD 1375–1550)
"Neil MacGregor explores the great empires of the world in the threshold of the modern era." First broadcast week beginning 13 September 2010.

The first global economy (AD 1450–1600)
"Neil MacGregor traces the impact of travel, trade and conquest from 1450 to 1600." First broadcast 20 September 2010.

Tolerance and intolerance (AD 1550–1700)
"Neil MacGregor tells how the great religions lived together in the C16th and C17th." First broadcast week beginning 27 September 2010.

Exploration, exploitation and enlightenment (AD 1680–1820)
"Neil MacGregor on the misunderstandings that can happen when different worlds collide." First broadcast 4 October 2010.

Mass production, mass persuasion (AD 1780–1914)
"How industrialisation, mass politics and imperial ambitions changed the world." First broadcast week beginning 11 October 2010.

The world of our making (AD 1914–2010)
"Neil MacGregor explores aspects of sexual, political and economic history of recent times." First broadcast week beginning 18 October 2010.

Special editions 
A special radio programme on Radio 4, first broadcast on 18 May 2011, featured one of the many thousands of items nominated on the BBC website by members of the public as an object of special significance. The object chosen to be featured on the programme was an oil painting depicting a young woman that was nominated by Peter Lewis.  The painting, which belonged to Lewis' uncle, Bryn Roberts, was painted from a postcard photograph of Roberts' girlfriend (and later wife), Peggy Gullup, by an anonymous Jewish artist for Roberts whilst he was a prisoner of war at Auschwitz in Poland.

Another special programme was broadcast on 25 December 2020. Neil MacGregor and a roundtable of guests, comprising Mary Beard, Chibundu Onuzo, Scarlett Curtis, David Attenborough, and Hisham Matar, discussed adding a 101st object to represent how the world has changed in the past decade since the end of the original series. The objects ultimately chosen were the British Museum's collection of 'Dark Water, Burning World' sculptures by Syrian-British artist Issam Kourbaj. They depict small, fragile boats filled with matchsticks - representing the plight of refugees of the Syrian Civil War in particular and migrants in general.

Art Fund Prize 
The British Museum won the 2011 Art Fund Prize for museums and galleries for its part in the A History of the World in 100 Objects series.  The prize, worth £100,000, was presented to the museum by Jeremy Hunt, Secretary of State for Culture, Olympics, Media and Sport, in a ceremony at London on 15 June 2011.

The chairman of the panel of judges, Michael Portillo, noted that the judges were "particularly impressed by the truly global scope of the British Museum's project, which combined intellectual rigour and open heartedness, and went far beyond the boundaries of the museum's walls". The judges were also very impressed by the way that the project used digital media in ground-breaking and novel ways to interact with audiences.

Touring exhibition
During 2016 and 2017 a touring exhibition of many of the one hundred objects, also titled History of the World in 100 Objects, was held in a number of countries and territories, including Australia, Japan, the United Arab Emirates, Taiwan, and China (first at the National Museum of China in Beijing, and then at Shanghai Museum). Due to the conditions encountered while touring different countries some exhibits had to be returned to the British Museum for maintenance during tour, and were replaced by other objects from the British Museum collections. Some controversial exhibits were excluded from the exhibition in some countries. Object 90 (Jade bi with poem) was not included in the exhibition held in China because it may have been looted from the Old Summer Palace in Beijing. In addition, a piece of Chinese brocade that had been included in the touring exhibition elsewhere was not included in the exhibition in China because it was collected from the Mogao Caves by Aurel Stein under controversial circumstances.

See also
 Relic: Guardians of the Museum - Children's tie in of the project. 
Our Top Ten Treasures
 Britain's Secret Treasures
 A History of Ireland in 100 Objects
List of history podcasts

References

External links

A History of the World, BBC and The British Museum
A History of the World in 100 Objects (BBC podcasts page)
A History of the World in Five Minutes (5-minute video summary of the 100 objects)
Review by Miranda Sawyer in The Observer

British Museum in media
BBC Radio 4 programmes
Historical objects
History of the World in 100 Objects